Erika Ervin (born February 23, 1979), known professionally as Amazon Eve, is an American model, fitness trainer, and actress. She has appeared on the cover of Australian magazine Zoo Weekly and played a regular character on American Horror Story: Freak Show and in a small role in American Horror Story: Apocalypse.

Early life and education
She grew  taller over the next four years. Around age 25, she underwent gender-affirming surgery. Ervin attended college in the San Francisco Bay Area and studied theater arts and business management.

Career
Ervin ventured to obtain roles as an actress but gave up on the idea when she was constantly offered roles as an alien or monster. Later she studied law and exercise physiology. Tired of the office life that she had pursued and unhappy with her weight, she joined a gym but strove for an unrealistic size 0 physique that almost resulted in ending her life. Eventually she developed a healthier body image and began to view herself as a super-sized version of Super Woman and became a personal trainer devoted to instilling realistic expectations for herself and her clients. She tours the world participating in height comparison photo shoots and regular modeling jobs and posts her tour on her website.

In 2011, she was crowned the World's Tallest Professional Model by Guinness World Records.

Appearances
In the September 2013 issue of Harper's Bazaar, Carine Roitfeld, former editor-in-chief of Vogue Paris, wrote an article, "Carine Roitfeld's 'Singular Beauties'", with photographs by Karl Lagerfeld. The article includes 25 models and is "an homage to the diversity of women". Among the models are Scarlett Johansson, Carmen Dell'Orefice (82 years old), Gabourey Sidibe, and Ervin, who is paired with 5'9" Xiao Wen. There is also a video about the making of the article in which Xiao Wen and Ervin appear.

Personal life
Ervin underwent gender-affirming surgery in 2004. In interviews, Ervin has talked about the problems of being a tall woman. Other topics she has addressed include her troubles growing up dealing with teasing in high school, family problems and her modeling experience.

Filmography

Film

Television

References

External links 

 
 

Living people
1979 births
21st-century American actresses
Actors from Redondo Beach, California
Actresses from California
Female models from California
American television actresses
People from Turlock, California
American LGBT actors
LGBT people from California
Transgender female models
Transgender actresses
Skyline High School (Oakland, California) alumni
21st-century American LGBT people